Enterprise Municipal Airport may refer to:

 Enterprise Municipal Airport (Alabama) in Enterprise, Alabama, United States (FAA: EDN, IATA: ETS)
 Enterprise Municipal Airport (Oregon) in Enterprise, Oregon, United States (FAA: 8S4)